ICARE Institute of Medical Sciences & Research, established in 2011, is a private medical college located in Haldia, West Bengal. This college offers the Bachelor of Medicine and Surgery (MBBS) courses and postgraduate MD courses in Pathology, Pharmacology, Microbiology, Biochemistry. This college is affiliated with the West Bengal University of Health Sciences and recognized by the National Medical Commission. It is established by a society named Indian Centre for Advancement of Research and Education (ICARE). It is connected to a  500-bed multispeciality facility named the Bidhan Chanda Roy Hospital.

Departments

The departments in ICARE Institute of Medical Sciences and Research are as follows:

 Department of Anasthesiology
 Department of Anatomy
 Department of Biochemistry
 Department of Community Medicine
 Department of Dentistry
 Department of Dermatology and V&L
 Department of ENT(Ear, Nose and Throat)
 Department of General Medicine
 Department of General Surgery
 Department of Obstetrics & Gynaecology
 Department of Ophthalmology
 Department of Orthopaedics
 Department of Paediatrics
 Department of Radiology

 Department of Microbiology
 Department of Pathology
 Department of Pharmacology
 Department of Physiology
 Department of Psychiatry
 Department of Forensic Medicine

See also

References

External links
 

Medical colleges in West Bengal
Affiliates of West Bengal University of Health Sciences
Universities and colleges in Purba Medinipur district
2011 establishments in West Bengal